The San Ramon Valley is a valley and region in Contra Costa County and Alameda County, in the East Bay region of the San Francisco Bay Area in northern California.

Geography
The valley is between the Oakland Hills on the west, and the Diablo Range on the east.

The valley's population is around 130,000 people.

The cities of San Ramon and Danville, as well as the southern edge of Walnut Creek are located in the valley, as are the census-designated places (CDPs) of Alamo, Blackhawk, Camino Tassajara and Diablo.

Interstate 680 serves as the primary transportation route for the area. The Iron Horse Regional Trail also runs the length of the valley.

See also
 Rancho San Ramon (Pacheco-Castro) — 19th century Mexican rancho of the northern valley.
 Rancho San Ramon (Amador) — 19th century Mexican rancho of the southern valley.

References

External links
Museum of the San Ramon Valley

Valleys of Contra Costa County, California
Danville, California
San Ramon, California
Subregions of the San Francisco Bay Area
Valleys of California